The Paul Bryant Bridge is a four-lane, $28 million bridge spanning the Black Warrior River along Alabama State Route 297 in Tuscaloosa, Alabama. Originally slated to open in December 2003, construction delays resulted in its opening on April 23, 2004.

Serving as the fourth crossing of the Black Warrior River in Tuscaloosa County, this was the first phase of the larger Warrior Loop project slated for completion by 2012. Constructed by the R.R. Dawson Bridge Company, during the course of its construction, two workers died while on the job in October 2001 and again in April 2003.

In January 2003, then Governor Don Siegleman ordered state transportation director Paul Bowlin to name the bridge in honor of long-time University of Alabama head football coach Paul "Bear" Bryant.

See also
 List of crossings of the Black Warrior River
 Alabama State Route 297

References

Bridges completed in 2004
Transportation in Tuscaloosa, Alabama
Bridges over the Black Warrior River
Buildings and structures in Tuscaloosa, Alabama
Road bridges in Alabama
Transportation buildings and structures in Tuscaloosa County, Alabama
2004 establishments in Alabama